Sheikh Ahmad Tijani Ali Cisse (born 1955) is the spiritual leader of the Tijaniyya Sufi order. The Tijaniyya is the largest Sufi order
in Western Africa and its leader is responsible for nearly 300 million Sufi adherents.

Early life and education
Cisse  is the second son of Shaykh Ali Cisse and Fatima Zahra Niasse, daughter of Shaykh Ibrahim Niass, major leader of the Tijānī Sufi order. He studied under his father Ali and grandfather Ibrahim in Senegal focusing mostly on Arabic literature and poetry. Thereafter, he went to Egypt where he lived with his elder brother, Sufi scholar Shaykh Hassan Cisse who was in his last year of advanced study. In 1974, he graduated first in his class at the Al-Azhar preparatory school receiving a diploma in Arabic language. In 1977, he received a B.A. in Arabic Language from Al-Azhar University and in 1981, he earned a M.A. in Theology later serving on the faculty of Al-Azhar University in the department of Hadith (or religious edicts)

Career
After completing his education in Egypt, he went on a religious mission to Africa, the Middle East and the Americas to seek converts to Islam (or Dawah) through religious debates and public speaking. At the same time, he published several books including a complete edit of Shaykh Ibrahim’s Kashif al-Ilbas, published a collection of Shaykh Ibrahim’s writings (which he named Sa’adat al-Anam), and assisted in the publication of a comprehensive collection of Shaykh Ibrahim’s supplications, Kanz al-Masun.

On August 15, 2008, Cisse was unanimously elected to the Imamnate by the leading members of the Tijaniyya Sufi order Cisse is based in Senegal and serves as the Imam of the Grand Mosque in the village of Medina Baye, now part of the city of Kaolack, one of Western Africa's key positions of Islamic leadership. The Tijaniyya Sufi order was founded by Ahmad ibn Muhammad al-Tijani al-Hasani in the late 18th century.  As the spiritual leader of the Tijaniyya, Cisse is considered have direct spiritual inspiration (or Fayda Tijaniyya) which gives him supreme authority to advise and direct the order's followers.

Honors and accolades
In 2001, he was appointed Senegal’s General Commissioner for the Hajj. In 2006, he was appointed by Senegalese President Abdoulaye Wade as a “Special Missions Ambassador.” In 1993, he received Senegal’s distinguished award, the Ordre de Merite. He has been named among the world's 500 most influential Muslims, placing at #23 as of 2012.

References

Living people
Senegalese Sufi religious leaders
Sufism in Africa
Senegalese Sufis
Wolof people
Senegalese expatriates in Egypt
1955 births
Tijaniyyah order